BR-401 is a federal highway in the state of Roraima in Brazil. The  road connects Boa Vista with Normandia and the road network of Guyana. 

The  over the Branco River was completed on 29 August 1975. The Takutu River Bridge was completed in 2009, and provides access to the road network of Guyana. The bridge switches between left- and right-hand drive automatically. 

In 2018, the section between Boa Vista and the border with Guyana was fully paved. As of 2020, a section of almost 80 kilometres between Bonfim and Normandia is still unpaved.

References

External links

Federal highways in Brazil
Transport in Roraima